This list of islands in Spain encapsulates the country's islands both within its territorial borders and its overseas possessions. The total number of islands is 179.

List

Spanish Micronesia
Spain owned several Pacific islands as part of the Spanish East Indies. After its defeat in the Spanish–American War of 1898, it lost the Philippines. The German–Spanish Treaty (1899) sold the Carolinas, Marianas and Palau to the German Empire. In 1948, Emilio Pastor Santos of the Spanish National Research Council found that the charts and maps up to 1899 had shown that Kapingamarangi and a few other islands had never been considered part of the Caroline Islands, were not included in the description of the territory transferred to Germany and were never ceded by Spain; therefore, Spain would retain sovereignty. In 2014, the Spanish government closed any speculation on the issue of its possession in the Pacific with an answer in the Congress to the deputy Jon Iñarritu. According to its interpretation, Spain yielded in 1899 every remaining possession in the Pacific.

References

Spain, List of islands of
Islands